Thannenkirch is a commune and tourist destination in the northeastern French department of Haut-Rhin.

Geography
The village is located in the foothills of the Taennchel Massif at an elevation of 468m. It is about 65 km southwest of Strasbourg, 20 km north of Colmar, and 5 km southwest of the château du Haut-Koenigsbourg.

See also
 Communes of the Haut-Rhin department

References

Communes of Haut-Rhin